This gallery of head of state standards shows the Presidential or Royal Standards, a flag that is related to the head of state of that country.



A

B

C

D

E

F

G

H

I

J

K

L

M

N

O

P

R

S

T

U

V

Y

Z

Unrecognized states

See also 
 Gallery of head of government standards

Notes 

Standards (flags)
Image galleries